Cross Lake is a large lake in Manitoba on the Nelson River north of Lake Winnipeg. It is long and narrow and extends 102 km (63 mi) east-northeast.

The Nelson River west channel enters the lake at the Jenpeg Dam and the Nelson River east channel enters near the communities of Cross Lake and Cross Lake First Nation. The river then flows north to Sipiwesk Lake. The Minago River enters on the west.

The lake level is regulated by Manitoba Hydro at the Jenpeg Generating Station at the southern end of the lake.

Portage Routes 
From Moon Lake, the source of the Minago River, a portage led to South Moose Lake and the Saskatchewan River. On the southeast side of Cross Lake via the Walker River, Walker Lake and Kapaspwaypanik Lake the Kapaspwaypanik Portage led to the Carrot River and Oxford Lake on the Hayes River.

See also 
List of lakes of Manitoba
 List of generating stations in Manitoba
 Nelson River Hydroelectric Project

References 

Lakes of Manitoba